Hämeenlinna railway station is located in the town of Hämeenlinna, Finland.
Hämeenlinna belongs to the oldest railway stations in Finland, because the first railway line in Finland was opened between Helsinki and Hämeenlinna in 1862. The original station building, designed by the architect Carl Albert Edelfelt, was destroyed during the Finnish Civil War in 1918. The current red brick station building was designed by Thure Hellström and completed in 1921.

Hämeenlinna is located about halfway between Helsinki and Tampere, and because of this, the station has much pass-through traffic, even though the Hämeenlinna station is not a crossing-point station. All trains between Helsinki and Tampere, except Pendolino trains, stop at Hämeenlinna. The Hämeenlinna station also has an underpass tunnel. The station building has a restaurant.

Gallery

References

External links

 The built cultural environment project
 Hämeenlinna railway station at Fonecta

Railway station
Railway stations in Kanta-Häme
Railway stations opened in 1862
Art Nouveau architecture in Finland
Art Nouveau railway stations
Railway stations opened in 1921
1862 establishments in Finland